Theatrical production management is a sub-division of stagecraft. The production management team (consisting of a production manager and any number of assistants) is responsible for realizing the visions of the producer and the director or choreographer within constraints of technical possibility. This involves coordinating the operations of various production sub-disciplines (scenic, costume design, lighting, sound, projection, automation, video, pyrotechnics, stage management, etc.) of the presentation.

In addition to management and financial skills, a production manager must have detailed knowledge of all production disciplines including a thorough understanding of the interaction of these disciplines during the production process. This may involve dealing with matters ranging from the procurement of staff, materials and services, to freight, customs coordination, telecommunications, labor relations, logistics, information technology, government liaison, venue booking, scheduling, operations management, mending delay problems and workplace safety.

References

Stagecraft
Filmmaking occupations
Theatrical occupations
Theatrical management
Road crew

ca:Director de producció
cs:Produkční
ja:生産管理